Alberdi is the city in the Ñeembucú Department of Paraguay.

Alberdi is located along the Paraguay River. Its name pays homage to the Argentine writer Juan Bautista Alberdi, who voiced his sympathy and support for Paraguay during the Paraguayan War.

Most of the city is located in the part of the region of the Lake Ypoá, with rich ecology and beautiful landscapes, where there are many estuaries, streams and rivers that contribute to a cool and humid climate. Being at the Argentina–Paraguay border, a popular characteristic of the city is its commerce with the Argentine capital city of Formosa, which sits across the river.

It is considered to be as much important as the biggest Paraguayan urban centers like the cities of Encarnación or Fernando de la Mora due to the intense commercial movement. Since Alberdi is near to Formosa large number of Argentines from Formosa city flow to the Paraguayan city of Alberdi to purchase various merchandise, mainly clothes, because of their marked difference with Argentine prices. For many goods, especially of Chinese origin, the prices are only a quarter of what is paid in Argentina, being of the same quality and brands. Many small business owners in nearby Argentine provinces visit Alberdi once or several times a year to supply their businesses. The main visits are from the Argentine cities Corrientes, Resistencia, Clorinda and Reconquista. The Villeta–Alberdi–Pilar Route passes by the city of Alberdi, which connects Asunción to the southern part of Paraguay.

Sources
World Gazetteer: Paraguay – World-Gazetteer.com

Populated places in the Ñeembucú Department